Matheus Diogo Desevinka de Oliveira (born 10 June 2002), commonly known as Alemão, is a Brazilian footballer who currently plays as a forward for Operário Ferroviário.

Career statistics

Club

Notes

References

2002 births
Living people
Brazilian footballers
Association football forwards
Operário Ferroviário Esporte Clube players